Oum Ali is a town and commune in Tébessa Province in north-eastern Algeria, near the border with Algeria.

References

Communes of Tébessa Province
Cities in Algeria
Algeria